Fernando Ramírez was a Mexican sprinter. He competed in the men's 100 metres at the 1932 Summer Olympics.

References

Year of birth missing
Year of death missing
Athletes (track and field) at the 1932 Summer Olympics
Mexican male sprinters
Olympic athletes of Mexico
Place of birth missing
Central American and Caribbean Games medalists in athletics